The Green Bay Packers are a professional American football franchise based in Green Bay, Wisconsin.  They are currently members of the North Division of the National Football Conference (NFC) in the National Football League (NFL), and are the third-oldest franchise in the NFL.  Founded in 1919 by coach, player, and future Hall of Fame inductee Curly Lambeau and sports and telegraph editor George Whitney Calhoun, the Packers organization has become one of the most successful professional football teams, having won a total of 12 professional American football championships—nine NFL Championships and four Super Bowls—the most in the NFL.  The franchise has recorded 18 NFL divisional titles, eight NFL conference championships, and the second most regular season and overall victories of any NFL franchise, behind the Chicago Bears.

From the inaugural season in 1919 to the completion of the 2007 NFL season, 1493 NFL players have played at least one regular season or playoff game for the Green Bay Packers.  26 of these individuals have been inducted into the Pro Football Hall of Fame, while 109 have been inducted into the Green Bay Packers Hall of Fame (22 players have been inducted into both).

Key

Players

E
{| class="wikitable sortable" style="text-align: center;" width = 68%;
|-
!width=15%|Player name
!width=7%|Position
!width=20%|College
!width=15%|Seasons
!width=6%|Games
|-
|style="text-align:left;"|
|B
|style="text-align:left;"|Texas Tech
|1948–49	
|24
|-
|style="text-align:left;"|
|C
|style="text-align:left;"|Monmouth
|1922–32
|120
|-
|style="text-align:left;"|
|G
|style="text-align:left;"|Oklahoma
|1949
|12
|-
|style="text-align:left;"|
|T
|style="text-align:left;"|John Carroll
|1950–51	
|19
|-
|style="text-align:left;"|
|CB/S
|style="text-align:left;"|Clemson
|1999–2003
|53
|-
|style="text-align:left;"|
|DT
|style="text-align:left;"|Wichita State
|1979
|9
|-
|style="text-align:left;"|
|FB
|style="text-align:left;"|Wisconsin
|1985–86
|31
|-
|style="text-align:left;"|
|E
|style="text-align:left;"|Virginia
|1951–54
|48
|-
|style="text-align:left;"|
|LB
|style="text-align:left;"|Toledo
|2014–16
|38
|-
|style="text-align:left;"|
|DB
|style="text-align:left;"|Central Michigan
|1987
|1
|-
|style="text-align:left;"|
|FB
|style="text-align:left;"|Missouri
|1980–86
|103
|-
|style="text-align:left;"|
|CB
|style="text-align:left;"|Southern
|1970–75
|83
|-
|style="text-align:left;"|
|LB
|style="text-align:left;"|South Carolina
|2022–present
|
|-
|style="text-align:left;"|
|G
|style="text-align:left;"|Minnesota
|1976
|3
|-
|style="text-align:left;"|
|G
|style="text-align:left;"|Northwestern
|1934–41
|64
|-
|style="text-align:left;"|
|B
|style="text-align:left;"|South Dakota State
|1930–33
|44
|-
|style="text-align:left;"|
|FB
|style="text-align:left;"|Notre Dame
|1926–27
|19
|-
|style="text-align:left;"|
|WR
|style="text-align:left;"|Texas Christian
|1982–88
|85
|-
|style="text-align:left;"|
|G
|style="text-align:left;"|Bowling Green
|1987
|1
|-
|style="text-align:left;"|
|T
|style="text-align:left;"|Southern Methodist
|1949
|12
|-
|style="text-align:left;"|
|E
|style="text-align:left;"|Iowa
|1940, 43
|17
|-
|style="text-align:left;"|
|CB
|style="text-align:left;"|Louisiana Tech
|1993–97
|79
|-
|style="text-align:left;"|
|B
|style="text-align:left;"|California
|1929
|3
|-
|style="text-align:left;"|
|G
|style="text-align:left;"|Texas Christian
|1933–37
|57
|-
|}

F

{| class="wikitable sortable" style="text-align: center;" width = 68%;
|-
!width=15%|Player name
!width=7%|Position
!width=20%|College
!width=15%|Seasons
!width=6%|Games
|-
|style="text-align:left;"|
|FB
|style="text-align:left;"|St. Mary's (Calif.)
|1943
|10
|-
|style="text-align:left;"|
|DE
|style="text-align:left;"|Arizona State
|1974
|13
|-
|style="text-align:left;"|
|C/LB
|style="text-align:left;"|Wisconsin
|1952
|11
|-
|style="text-align:left;"|
|QB
|style="text-align:left;"|Southern Mississippi
|1992–2007
|255
|-
|style="text-align:left;"|
|E
|style="text-align:left;"|Marquette
|1922
|1
|-
|style="text-align:left;"|
|T
|style="text-align:left;"|Abilene Christian
|1986
|15
|-
|style="text-align:left;"|
|B
|style="text-align:left;"|Tennessee
|1940
|1
|-
|style="text-align:left;"|
|FB
|style="text-align:left;"|No College
|1953–58
|65
|-
|style="text-align:left;"|
|WR
|style="text-align:left;"|Texas A&M
|2001–06
|60
|-
|style="text-align:left;"|
|QB
|style="text-align:left;"|Nebraska
|1986
|3
|-
|style="text-align:left;"|
|G
|style="text-align:left;"|Wisconsin
|2002
|16
|-
|style="text-align:left;"|
|T
|style="text-align:left;"|Villanova
|1949
|12
|-
|style="text-align:left;"|
|T
|style="text-align:left;"|Michigan State
|1982
|2
|-
|style="text-align:left;"|
|TE
|style="text-align:left;"|Texas
|2008–13
|
|-
|style="text-align:left;"|
|T
|style="text-align:left;"|Detroit
|1957
|3
|-
|style="text-align:left;"|
|RB
|style="text-align:left;"|Notre Dame
|2002–05
|60
|-
|style="text-align:left;"|
|TE
|style="text-align:left;"|Wisconsin–Eau Claire
|1987
|1
|-
|style="text-align:left;"|
|B
|style="text-align:left;"|Creighton
|1930–32
|24
|-
|style="text-align:left;"|
|E
|style="text-align:left;"|Marquette
|1926
|12
|-
|style="text-align:left;"|
|C/T
|style="text-align:left;"|California-Los Angeles
|1998–2005
|98
|-
|style="text-align:left;"|
|DT
|style="text-align:left;"|Notre Dame
|2001
|16
|-
|style="text-align:left;"|
|LB
|style="text-align:left;"|Pittsburgh
|1967–70
|40
|-
|style="text-align:left;"|
|TE
|style="text-align:left;"|Utah
|1963–69
|95
|-
|style="text-align:left;"|
|P
|style="text-align:left;"|Central Florida
|2005
|2
|-
|style="text-align:left;"|
|C/LB
|style="text-align:left;"|Texas Tech
|1942–49
|63
|-
|style="text-align:left;"|
|FB
|style="text-align:left;"|Texas Christian
|1952
|12
|-
|style="text-align:left;"|
|QB
|style="text-align:left;"|Louisiana State
|2008–2011, 13–2014
|
|-
|style="text-align:left;"|
|S
|style="text-align:left;"|Pittsburgh
|1984–86
|38
|-
|style="text-align:left;"|
|DE
|style="text-align:left;"|Washington
|1961
|14
|-
|style="text-align:left;"|
|RB
|style="text-align:left;"|Louisiana State
|1989–90
|30
|-
|style="text-align:left;"|
|CB
|style="text-align:left;"|Fresno State
|2005
|1
|-
|style="text-align:left;"|
|DE
|style="text-align:left;"|Michigan
|1958
|11
|-
|style="text-align:left;"|
|LB
|style="text-align:left;"|Southern Methodist
|1953–63
|138
|-
|style="text-align:left;"|
|G
|style="text-align:left;"|Montana
|1947
|10
|-
|style="text-align:left;"|
|B
|style="text-align:left;"|Arkansas
|1946–53
|80
|-
|style="text-align:left;"|
|WR
|style="text-align:left;"|Texas-El Paso
|2006–07
|8
|-
|style="text-align:left;"|
|B
|style="text-align:left;"|Oregon State
|1958–59
|24
|-
|style="text-align:left;"|
|LB
|style="text-align:left;"|Boston College
|2010–13
|39
|-
|style="text-align:left;"|
|G
|style="text-align:left;"|Washington
|1945
|2
|-
|style="text-align:left;"|
|TE
|style="text-align:left;"|Miami (Fla.)
|2000–07
|114
|-
|style="text-align:left;"|
|T
|style="text-align:left;"|St. Thomas
|1930
|2
|-
|style="text-align:left;"|
|WR
|style="text-align:left;"|Tulane
|1986
|1
|-
|style="text-align:left;"|
|S
|style="text-align:left;"|Tulsa
|2002, 05
|7
|-
|style="text-align:left;"|
|DE
|style="text-align:left;"|Syracuse
|1997
|9
|-
|style="text-align:left;"|
|WR
|style="text-align:left;"|Virginia Tech
|1995–2001, 03
|116
|-
|style="text-align:left;"|
|DB
|style="text-align:left;"|Auburn
|1959
|12
|-
|style="text-align:left;"|
|G/LB
|style="text-align:left;"|Colorado State
|1943
|5
|-
|style="text-align:left;"|
|B
|style="text-align:left;"|Wisconsin–Stevens Point
|1942–50
|99
|-
|style="text-align:left;"|
|E
|style="text-align:left;"|Michigan
|1941, 45
|9
|-
|style="text-align:left;"|
|S
|style="text-align:left;"|Texas Christian
|2003–04
|10
|-
|style="text-align:left;"|
|CB
|style="text-align:left;"|Northern Iowa
|1991
|16
|-
|style="text-align:left;"|
|RB
|style="text-align:left;"|Auburn
|1987–90
|45
|-
|style="text-align:left;"|
|QB
|style="text-align:left;"|Penn State
|1986
|7
|-
|}

G

{| class="wikitable sortable" style="text-align: center;" width = 68%;
|-
!width=15%|Player name
!width=7%|Position
!width=20%|College
!width=15%|Seasons
!width=6%|Games
|-
|style="text-align:left;"|
|T
|style="text-align:left;"|Florida State
|1991
|4
|-
|style="text-align:left;"|
|RB
|style="text-align:left;"|Liberty
|2005–06
|9
|-
|style="text-align:left;"|
|TE
|style="text-align:left;"|Southern California
|1998
|1
|-
|style="text-align:left;"|
|G
|style="text-align:left;"|Tennessee
|1993–95
|48
|-
|style="text-align:left;"|
|LB
|style="text-align:left;"|Utah State
|2020
|
|-
|style="text-align:left;"|
|E
|style="text-align:left;"|Wisconsin
|1931–40
|103
|-
|style="text-align:left;"|
|K
|style="text-align:left;"|Southern Methodist
|1983–84
|19
|-
|style="text-align:left;"|
|FB
|style="text-align:left;"|No College
|1922
|7
|-
|style="text-align:left;"|
|G
|style="text-align:left;"|Wisconsin
|1922–26
|55
|-
|style="text-align:left;"|
|WR
|style="text-align:left;"|Clemson
|2005
|2
|-
|style="text-align:left;"|
|QB
|style="text-align:left;"|Stanford
|1954
|9
|-
|style="text-align:left;"|
|TE
|style="text-align:left;"|New Mexico Highlands
|1971–73
|30
|-
|style="text-align:left;"|
|LB
|style="text-align:left;"|Miami
|2020
|
|-
|style="text-align:left;"|
|DE/LB
|style="text-align:left;"|Michigan
|2019–present
|
|-
|style="text-align:left;"|
|DT
|style="text-align:left;"|Virginia
|1962
|10
|-
|style="text-align:left;"|
|C
|style="text-align:left;"|Baylor
|1946–47
|23
|-
|style="text-align:left;"|
|B
|style="text-align:left;"|No College
|1921, 23
|9
|-
|style="text-align:left;"|
|WR
|style="text-align:left;"|Florida State
|1975
|4
|-
|style="text-align:left;"|
|DE
|style="text-align:left;"|San Diego State
|2000–07
|117
|-
|style="text-align:left;"|
|T
|style="text-align:left;"|Penn State
|1983
|15
|-
|style="text-align:left;"|
|WR
|style="text-align:left;"|Texas-El Paso
|1972
|1
|-
|style="text-align:left;"|
|B
|style="text-align:left;"|Virginia
|1947
|10
|-
|style="text-align:left;"|
|G
|style="text-align:left;"|Minnesota
|1966–74, 76
|128
|-
|style="text-align:left;"|
|QB
|style="text-align:left;"|Norfolk State
|1987
|1
|-
|style="text-align:left;"|
|DB
|style="text-align:left;"|California
|2009
|5
|-
|style="text-align:left;"|
|B
|style="text-align:left;"|Wisconsin
|1948–51
|46
|-
|style="text-align:left;"|
|LB
|style="text-align:left;"|Air Force
|2000–01
|23
|-
|style="text-align:left;"|
|WR
|style="text-align:left;"|Oregon
|1972–73
|26
|-
|style="text-align:left;"|
|WR
|style="text-align:left;"|Ohio State
|2002
|15
|-
|style="text-align:left;"|
|B
|style="text-align:left;"|Marquette
|1921–22
|6
|-
|style="text-align:left;"|
|G/C
|style="text-align:left;"|Oklahoma State
|1977–82
|85
|-
|style="text-align:left;"|
|G/B
|style="text-align:left;"|Wisconsin
|1933–45
|120
|-
|style="text-align:left;"|
|LS
|style="text-align:left;"|Arkansas
|2008–17
| 152
|-
|style="text-align:left;"|
|RB
|style="text-align:left;"|Graceland
|2000–01
|12
|-
|style="text-align:left;"|
|RB
|style="text-align:left;"|Yankton
|1973–74
|19
|-
|style="text-align:left;"|
|DB
|style="text-align:left;"|Baylor
|2014
|
|-
|style="text-align:left;"|
|E
|style="text-align:left;"|Tulsa
|1945–49
|38
|-
|style="text-align:left;"|
|CB/KR	
|style="text-align:left;"|Stanford
|2002
|13
|-
|style="text-align:left;"|
|WR
|style="text-align:left;"|Michigan State
|1973
|2
|-
|style="text-align:left;"|
|T
|style="text-align:left;"|Illinois
|1936–37
|22
|-
|style="text-align:left;"|
|DB
|style="text-align:left;"|Central Michigan
|2010
|2
|-
|style="text-align:left;"|
|DB
|style="text-align:left;"|Purdue
|1956
|5
|-
|style="text-align:left;"|
|RB
|style="text-align:left;"|Illinois
|1966–70
|63
|-
|style="text-align:left;"|
|RB
|style="text-align:left;"|Tennessee
|2002
|3
|-
|style="text-align:left;"|
|TE
|style="text-align:left;"|Miami (Fla.)
|2018–19
|
|-
|style="text-align:left;"|
|DE
|style="text-align:left;"|West Virginia
|1993
|7
|-
|style="text-align:left;"|
|RB
|style="text-align:left;"|Notre Dame
|2007–11
|15
|-
|style="text-align:left;"|
|T
|style="text-align:left;"|North Carolina
|1992
|2
|-
|style="text-align:left;"|
|E
|style="text-align:left;"|No College
|1923
|1
|-
|style="text-align:left;"|
|S
|style="text-align:left;"|Cal-State, Fullerton
|1975–83
|124
|-
|style="text-align:left;"|
|RB
|style="text-align:left;"|Nebraska
|2000–06
|96
|-
|style="text-align:left;"|
|RB
|style="text-align:left;"|Hawaii
|2011–12
|
|-
|style="text-align:left;"|
|WR
|style="text-align:left;"|Tulsa
|1976
|1
|-
|style="text-align:left;"|
|S
|style="text-align:left;"|James Madison
|2018–20
|
|-
|style="text-align:left;"|
|S
|style="text-align:left;"|Western Carolina
|1986–90
|72
|-
|style="text-align:left;"|
|G
|style="text-align:left;"|Notre Dame
|1933
|7
|-
|style="text-align:left;"|
|C/LB
|style="text-align:left;"|Arizona
|1939–41
|22
|-
|style="text-align:left;"|
|S
|style="text-align:left;"|Wisconsin
|1986
|9
|-
|style="text-align:left;"|
|T
|style="text-align:left;"|Southern Methodist
|1956, 58–70
|187
|-
|style="text-align:left;"|
|DB
|style="text-align:left;"|Baylor
|1956–65
|123
|-
|style="text-align:left;"|
|C
|style="text-align:left;"|Iowa
|1928
|5
|-
|style="text-align:left;"|
|HB
|style="text-align:left;"|Oklahoma A&M
|1950–52
|36
|-
|style="text-align:left;"|
|G
|style="text-align:left;"|Colorado
|1963–65
|42
|-
|style="text-align:left;"|
|FB
|style="text-align:left;"|Louisiana State
|1962–63
|28
|-
|style="text-align:left;"|
|B
|style="text-align:left;"|Michigan State
|1931–35
|51
|-
|style="text-align:left;"|
|T
|style="text-align:left;"|Pittsburgh
|1987
|1
|-
|style="text-align:left;"|
|LB
|style="text-align:left;"|Tulane
|1976–80
|75
|-
|style="text-align:left;"|
|DT
|style="text-align:left;"|Florida State
|2014–16
|
|-
|}

H

{| class="wikitable sortable" style="text-align: center;" width = 68%;
|-
!width=15%|Player name
!width=7%|Position
!width=20%|College
!width=15%|Seasons
!width=6%|Games
|-
|style="text-align:left;"|
|DB
|style="text-align:left;"|Wisconsin
|1960–61
|14
|-
|style="text-align:left;"|
|TE
|style="text-align:left;"|Elon
|1987–88
|20
|-
|style="text-align:left;"|
|FB
|style="text-align:left;"|Mississippi State
|1989–90
|32
|-
|style="text-align:left;"|
|QB
|style="text-align:left;"|Kansas
|1974–75
|22
|-
|style="text-align:left;"|
|T
|style="text-align:left;"|Utah
|1988
|13
|-
|style="text-align:left;"|
|CB
|style="text-align:left;"|Pittsburgh
|1971–76
|83
|-
|style="text-align:left;"|
|FB
|style="text-align:left;"|Boise State
|2007–10
|14
|-
|style="text-align:left;"|
|TE
|style="text-align:left;"|Clemson
|1999
|14
|-
|style="text-align:left;"|
|DE
|style="text-align:left;"|Southwestern Louisiana
|1989–90
|10
|-
|style="text-align:left;"|
|G
|style="text-align:left;"|Iowa
|1982–92
|162
|-
|style="text-align:left;"|
|LB
|style="text-align:left;"|Tulane
|1994
|5
|-
|style="text-align:left;"|
|RB
|style="text-align:left;"|Wyoming
|1969–71
|33
|-
|style="text-align:left;"|
|DT
|style="text-align:left;"|Arkansas
|1952–64
|160
|-
|style="text-align:left;"|
|T
|style="text-align:left;"|Indiana
|1930
|2
|-
|style="text-align:left;"|
|LB
|style="text-align:left;"|Illinois
|1976–77
|20
|-
|style="text-align:left;"|
|FB/E
|style="text-align:left;"|Minnesota
|1923
|1
|-
|style="text-align:left;"|
|P
|style="text-align:left;"|Marshall
|1999
|1
|-
|style="text-align:left;"|
|WR
|style="text-align:left;"|Eastern New Mexico
|1987
|3
|-
|style="text-align:left;"|
|S
|style="text-align:left;"|Texas-El Paso
|1970
|8
|-
|style="text-align:left;"|
|C
|style="text-align:left;"|California
|1949
|6
|-
|style="text-align:left;"|
|DT
|style="text-align:left;"|Notre Dame
|1970
|14
|-
|style="text-align:left;"|
|RB
|style="text-align:left;"|Wake Forest
|1987
|2
|-
|style="text-align:left;"|
|WR
|style="text-align:left;"|Kansas State
|2013
|4
|-
|style="text-align:left;"|
|QB
|style="text-align:left;"|Texas Tech
|2012
|4
|-
|style="text-align:left;"|
|DT
|style="text-align:left;"|Tennessee
|2007–10
|7
|-
|style="text-align:left;"|
|RB
|style="text-align:left;"|Pacific
|1975–77
|40
|-
|style="text-align:left;"|
|CB
|style="text-align:left;"|Texas A&M-Kingsville
|2003–07
|80
|-
|style="text-align:left;"|
|LB
|style="text-align:left;"|North Carolina
|1995–2001
|111
|-
|style="text-align:left;"|
|WR/CB/KR
|style="text-align:left;"|Vanderbilt
|1992–94
|37
|-
|style="text-align:left;"|
|B
|style="text-align:left;"|Wisconsin
|1925–26
|21
|-
|style="text-align:left;"|
|TE
|style="text-align:left;"|Northeast Louisiana
|1990–93
|60
|-
|style="text-align:left;"|
|G
|style="text-align:left;"|Arkansas
|1978–83
|74
|-
|style="text-align:left;"|
|RB
|style="text-align:left;"|Ohio State
|1998
|8
|-
|style="text-align:left;"|
|LB
|style="text-align:left;"|Memphis State
|1986–90
|76
|-
|style="text-align:left;"|
|TE
|style="text-align:left;"|Bishop
|1990
|4
|-
|style="text-align:left;"|
|DB
|style="text-align:left;"|Georgia Tech
|1987
|3
|-
|style="text-align:left;"|
|DB
|style="text-align:left;"|Texas-Arlington
|1964–71
|112
|-
|style="text-align:left;"|
|G
|style="text-align:left;"|Southern Methodist
|1987
|1
|-
|style="text-align:left;"|
|WR
|style="text-align:left;"|Arizona
|1977
|4
|-
|style="text-align:left;"|
|S
|style="text-align:left;"|Ball State
|1981–83
|29
|-
|style="text-align:left;"|
|QB
|style="text-align:left;"|Boston College
|1999–2000
|32
|-
|style="text-align:left;"|
|DB
|style="text-align:left;"|Memphis State
|1966
|14
|-
|style="text-align:left;"|
|S
|style="text-align:left;"|Montana
|1991–94
|58
|-
|style="text-align:left;"|
|G
|style="text-align:left;"|Colorado
|1977
|7
|-
|style="text-align:left;"|
|LB
|style="text-align:left;"|Ohio State
|2006–14
|32
|-
|style="text-align:left;"|
|CB
|style="text-align:left;"|Oklahoma
|2005
|11
|-
|style="text-align:left;"|
|CB/S
|style="text-align:left;"|Purdue
|2003–04
|30
|-
|style="text-align:left;"|
|E
|style="text-align:left;"|Minnesota
|1930
|1
|-
|style="text-align:left;"|
|RB
|style="text-align:left;"|Tennessee
|1997
|14
|-
|style="text-align:left;"|
|S
|style="text-align:left;"|Washington State
|1996
|2
|-
|style="text-align:left;"|
|E
|style="text-align:left;"|Notre Dame
|1921–22
|13
|-
|style="text-align:left;"|
|DB
|style="text-align:left;"|Fresno State
|1984–86
|42
|-
|style="text-align:left;"|
|E
|style="text-align:left;"|Marquette
|1923
|6
|-
|style="text-align:left;"|
|T
|style="text-align:left;"|Southern California
|1969–73
|61
|-
|style="text-align:left;"|
|DE
|style="text-align:left;"|St. Bonaventure
|1953
|9
|-
|style="text-align:left;"|
|DB
|style="text-align:left;"|Vanderbilt
|2012–15
|
|-
|style="text-align:left;"|
|HB
|style="text-align:left;"|St. Ambrose
|1924
|2
|-
|style="text-align:left;"|
|B
|style="text-align:left;"|Notre Dame
|1927–28
|5
|-
|style="text-align:left;"|
|QB
|style="text-align:left;"|Nevada
|1949
|12
|-
|style="text-align:left;"|
|LB
|style="text-align:left;"|Clemson
|1972–75
|34
|-
|style="text-align:left;"|
|G
|style="text-align:left;"|Missouri
|1999
|2
|-
|style="text-align:left;"|
|QB
|style="text-align:left;"|San Jose State
|1955
|2
|-
|style="text-align:left;"|
|DT
|style="text-align:left;"|Tulane
|1954–57
|48
|-
|style="text-align:left;"|
|FB
|style="text-align:left;"|North Carolina
|1995–2006
|188
|-
|style="text-align:left;"|
|B
|style="text-align:left;"|Princeton
|1924
|11
|-
|style="text-align:left;"|
|LB
|style="text-align:left;"|Miami (Fla.)
|1974
|14
|-
|style="text-align:left;"|
|DT
|style="text-align:left;"|Georgia Tech
|1963
|14
|-
|style="text-align:left;"|
|P
|style="text-align:left;"|Notre Dame
|1994–97
|64
|-
|style="text-align:left;"|
|B
|style="text-align:left;"|Regis
|1930–40
|109
|-
|style="text-align:left;"|
|RB
|style="text-align:left;"|Northwestern
|2005–06
|21
|-
|style="text-align:left;"|
|FB
|style="text-align:left;"|Baylor
|1960
|12
|-
|style="text-align:left;"|
|RB
|style="text-align:left;"|Michigan State
|1973
|7
|-
|style="text-align:left;"|
|B
|style="text-align:left;"|Stanford
|1929
|3
|-
|style="text-align:left;"|
|DB
|style="text-align:left;"|Texas A&I
|1972–74
|41
|-
|style="text-align:left;"|
|DE
|style="text-align:left;"|Auburn
|1988
|4
|-
|style="text-align:left;"|
|TE
|style="text-align:left;"|Richmond
|1970
|14
|-
|style="text-align:left;"|
|T
|style="text-align:left;"|Ohio State
|1968–77
|135
|-
|style="text-align:left;"|
|FB
|style="text-align:left;"|Bucknell
|1932–41
|113
|-
|style="text-align:left;"|
|E
|style="text-align:left;"|Pittsburgh
|1942
|1
|-
|style="text-align:left;"|
|G
|style="text-align:left;"|Minnesota
|1987
|3
|-
|style="text-align:left;"|
|LB
|style="text-align:left;"|Iowa
|2006
|8
|-
|style="text-align:left;"|
|T
|style="text-align:left;"|Santa Clara
|1984
|1
|-
|style="text-align:left;"|
|WR
|style="text-align:left;"|Notre Dame
|2006–07
|5
|-
|style="text-align:left;"|
|DT/DE
|style="text-align:left;"|Colorado
|1995–97
|42
|-
|style="text-align:left;"|
|LB
|style="text-align:left;"|Texas A&M
|1987–93
|103
|-
|style="text-align:left;"|
|LB
|style="text-align:left;"|South Carolina
|1963
|2
|-
|style="text-align:left;"|
|DE
|style="text-align:left;"|North Carolina
|1998–2002
|66
|-
|style="text-align:left;"|
|LB
|style="text-align:left;"|Southern California
|1996–98
|46
|-
|style="text-align:left;"|
|LB
|style="text-align:left;"|Penn State
|2001
|4
|-
|style="text-align:left;"|
|RB
|style="text-align:left;"|Portland State
|1998
|11
|-
|style="text-align:left;"|
|CB
|style="text-align:left;"|West Virginia
|1990–91
|29
|-
|style="text-align:left;"|
|DB
|style="text-align:left;"|Illinois State
|1978–84
|104
|-
|style="text-align:left;"|
|G
|style="text-align:left;"|Central State
|1994
|6
|-
|style="text-align:left;"|
|QB
|style="text-align:left;"|San Diego State
|1967–70
|20
|-
|style="text-align:left;"|
|B
|style="text-align:left;"|Notre Dame
|1957–62, 64–66
|104
|-
|style="text-align:left;"|
|CB
|style="text-align:left;"|North Carolina A&T
|2004–05
|23
|-
|style="text-align:left;"|
|LB
|style="text-align:left;"|North Carolina State
|1990
|1
|-
|style="text-align:left;"|
|WR/KR
|style="text-align:left;"|Michigan
|1996, 99
|24
|-
|style="text-align:left;"|
|B
|style="text-align:left;"|Indiana
|1921–22
|12
|-
|style="text-align:left;"|
|B
|style="text-align:left;"|Nebraska
|1938
|6
|-
|style="text-align:left;"|
|E
|style="text-align:left;"|Rice
|1952–58
|80
|-
|style="text-align:left;"|
|T
|style="text-align:left;"|Centenary, Geneva
|1929–33, 35
|75
|-
|style="text-align:left;"|
|RB
|style="text-align:left;"|Michigan
|1980–85
|84
|-
|style="text-align:left;"|
|RB
|style="text-align:left;"|Northeastern State
|1972
|12
|-
|style="text-align:left;"|
|G/T
|style="text-align:left;"|Notre Dame
|1981–85
|47
|-
|style="text-align:left;"|
|LB
|style="text-align:left;"|Penn State
|1975
|12
|-
|style="text-align:left;"|
|DE
|style="text-align:left;"|Auburn
|1984–86
|48
|-
|style="text-align:left;"|
|TE
|style="text-align:left;"|Central Michigan
|2005–06
|8
|-
|style="text-align:left;"|
|QB
|style="text-align:left;"|UCLA
|2015–17
|
|-
|style="text-align:left;"|
|DT/DE
|style="text-align:left;"|Kentucky State
|1999–2004
|85
|-
|style="text-align:left;"|
|DB
|style="text-align:left;"|Fresno State
|1970
|6
|-
|style="text-align:left;"|
|T
|style="text-align:left;"|Doane
|1972
|3
|-
|style="text-align:left;"|
|LB
|style="text-align:left;"|Minnesota
|1978–80
|22
|-
|style="text-align:left;"|
|C
|style="text-align:left;"|Notre Dame
|1954
|12
|-
|style="text-align:left;"|
|DE
|style="text-align:left;"|Appalachian State
|2006–07
|30
|-
|style="text-align:left;"|
|QB
|style="text-align:left;"|Alabama
|1971–73
|35
|-
|style="text-align:left;"|
|RB
|style="text-align:left;"|Minnesota
|1987
|1
|-
|style="text-align:left;"|
|T
|style="text-align:left;"|Western Michigan
|1993–94
|17
|-
|style="text-align:left;"|
|E/DB
|style="text-align:left;"|Alabama
|1935–45
|116
|-
|style="text-align:left;"|
|SS
|style="text-align:left;"|Iowa
|2013–16
|8
|-
|style="text-align:left;"|
|C
|style="text-align:left;"|Boston College
|1967–69, 76
|56
|-
|}

I
{| class="wikitable sortable" style="text-align: center;" width = 68%;
|-
!width=15%|Player name
!width=7%|Position
!width=20%|College
!width=15%|Seasons
!width=6%|Games
|-
|style="text-align:left;"|
|T
|style="text-align:left;"|Indiana State
|1993
|1
|-
|style="text-align:left;"|
|C
|style="text-align:left;"|Southeast Missouri State
|1960–63
|54
|-
|style="text-align:left;"|
|C/LB
|style="text-align:left;"|Michigan
|1942
|10
|-
|style="text-align:left;"|
|TE
|style="text-align:left;"|California
|1992–93
|18
|-
|style="text-align:left;"|
|WR
|style="text-align:left;"|Michigan State
|1995
|16
|-
|style="text-align:left;"|
|B
|style="text-align:left;"|Purdue
|1938–42
|54
|-
|style="text-align:left;"|
|RB
|style="text-align:left;"|Georgia Tech
|1979–86
|72
|-
|}

J

{| class="wikitable sortable" style="text-align: center;" width = 68%;
|-
!width=15%|Player name
!width=7%|Position
!width=20%|College
!width=15%|Seasons
!width=6%|Games
|-
|style="text-align:left;"|
|K
|style="text-align:left;"|Texas-El Paso
|1989–96
|126
|-
|style="text-align:left;"|
|G
|style="text-align:left;"|Louisiana State
|2002
|2
|-
|style="text-align:left;"|
|RB
|style="text-align:left;"|Nebraska
|2007–10
|
|-
|style="text-align:left;"|
|WR
|style="text-align:left;"|Washington State
|2002–03
|2
|-
|style="text-align:left;"|
|RB
|style="text-align:left;"|Nevada
|2016
|3
|-
|style="text-align:left;"|
|DT
|style="text-align:left;"|Knoxville
|2003–05
|34
|-
|style="text-align:left;"|
|RB
|style="text-align:left;"|Miami
|2004
|1
|-
|style="text-align:left;"|
|S
|style="text-align:left;"|Houston
|1992
|2
|-
|style="text-align:left;"|
|DB
|style="text-align:left;"|Iowa
|2018–20
|
|-
|style="text-align:left;"|
|TE
|style="text-align:left;"|Oklahoma
|1995–96
|25
|-
|style="text-align:left;"|
|G
|style="text-align:left;"|Southern California
|1976–80
|64
|-
|style="text-align:left;"|
|HB
|style="text-align:left;"|Utah
|1965
|14
|-
|style="text-align:left;"|
|B
|style="text-align:left;"|Oklahoma
|1947–49
|36
|-
|style="text-align:left;"|
|E
|style="text-align:left;"|Fordham
|1939–44
|55
|-
|style="text-align:left;"|
|CB
|style="text-align:left;"|Kent State
|1989
|16
|-
|style="text-align:left;"|
|WR
|style="text-align:left;"|Jackson State
|1967–68
|15
|-
|style="text-align:left;"|
|G
|style="text-align:left;"|Washington
|1975
|1
|-
|style="text-align:left;"|
|WR
|style="text-align:left;"|Saginaw Valley State
|2014–17
|
|-
|style="text-align:left;"|
|B
|style="text-align:left;"|Wisconsin
|1937–41
|50
|-
|style="text-align:left;"|
|E
|style="text-align:left;"|Duquesne
|1951
|3
|-
|style="text-align:left;"|
|TE
|style="text-align:left;"|Mount Senario
|1987
|3
|-
|style="text-align:left;"|
|WR
|style="text-align:left;"|Arizona State
|1981–84
|50
|-
|style="text-align:left;"|
|DB
|style="text-align:left;"|Louisiana State
|1987–88
|14
|-
|style="text-align:left;"|
|LB
|style="text-align:left;"|Minnesota
|1973–74
|10
|-
|style="text-align:left;"|
|S
|style="text-align:left;"|Howard
|2001
|6
|-
|style="text-align:left;"|
|DT/DE
|style="text-align:left;"|Central Michigan
|2004–07
|62
|-
|style="text-align:left;"|
|WR
|style="text-align:left;"|Western Michigan
|2006–12
|27
|-
|style="text-align:left;"|
|E
|style="text-align:left;"|Missouri
|1955
|4
|-
|style="text-align:left;"|
|FS
|style="text-align:left;"|Arkansas State
|2011–13
|
|-
|style="text-align:left;"|
|T
|style="text-align:left;"|South Dakota State
|1931
|2
|-
|style="text-align:left;"|
|G
|style="text-align:left;"|No College
|1987
|1
|-
|style="text-align:left;"|
|RB
|style="text-align:left;"|Iowa
|1981–82
|23
|-
|style="text-align:left;"|
|RB
|style="text-align:left;"|The Citadel
|1995–98
|56
|-
|style="text-align:left;"|
|DB
|style="text-align:left;"|Iowa
|1963–70
|107
|-
|style="text-align:left;"|
|T
|style="text-align:left;"|Georgia State
|2017
|5
|-
|style="text-align:left;"|
|DE
|style="text-align:left;"|Minnesota
|1941
|6
|-
|style="text-align:left;"|
|DT
|style="text-align:left;"|Maryland
|1979–80, 83
|45
|-
|style="text-align:left;"|
|LB
|style="text-align:left;"|Tennessee State
|1978
|3
|-
|style="text-align:left;"|
|DE
|style="text-align:left;"|Morris Brown
|1977–87
|148
|-
|style="text-align:left;"|
|T
|style="text-align:left;"|Arizona State
|1949
|8
|-
|style="text-align:left;"|
|G/LB
|style="text-align:left;"|Georgia
|1940–41
|22
|-
|style="text-align:left;"|
|DE
|style="text-align:left;"|Louisville
|2002–03
|11
|-
|style="text-align:left;"|
|HB
|style="text-align:left;"|Boston College
|1954–58
|53
|-
|style="text-align:left;"|Keshon Johnson
|CB
|style="text-align:left;"|Arizona
|1994, 97
|7
|-
|style="text-align:left;"|
|DB
|style="text-align:left;"|Mississippi State
|1987
|12
|-
|style="text-align:left;"|
|RB
|style="text-align:left;"|Northern Illinois
|1994–95
|14
|-
|style="text-align:left;"|
|DB
|style="text-align:left;"|San Jose State
|1952–53
|12
|-
|style="text-align:left;"|
|RB
|style="text-align:left;"|Louisiana State
|2009–10
|20
|-
|style="text-align:left;"|
|QB
|style="text-align:left;"|Texas A&I
|1976
|3
|-
|style="text-align:left;"|
|TE
|style="text-align:left;"|Florida State
|1994, 97
|13
|-
|style="text-align:left;"|
|RB
|style="text-align:left;"|North Carolina
|1979
|3
|-
|style="text-align:left;"|
|DT
|style="text-align:left;"|Michigan
|1952
|8
|-
|style="text-align:left;"|
|B
|style="text-align:left;"|Marquette
|1931, 34–38
|26
|-
|style="text-align:left;"|
|DT
|style="text-align:left;"|Texas A&M
|2006–07
|16
|-
|style="text-align:left;"|
|S
|style="text-align:left;"|Michigan
|1980, 82–83
|35
|-
|style="text-align:left;"|
|RB
|style="text-align:left;"|Texas-El Paso
|2017–present
|
|-
|style="text-align:left;"|
|G
|style="text-align:left;"|Indiana
|1934
|12
|-
|style="text-align:left;"|
|T
|style="text-align:left;"|Texas Southern
|1984
|2
|-
|style="text-align:left;"|
|G
|style="text-align:left;"|Alabama
|1927–28
|22
|-
|style="text-align:left;"|
|RB
|style="text-align:left;"|Nebraska
|1996
|1
|-
|style="text-align:left;"|
|DB
|style="text-align:left;"|Georgia
|1984–85
|24
|-
|style="text-align:left;"|
|WR/KR
|style="text-align:left;"|North Carolina A&T
|2005
|2
|-
|style="text-align:left;"|
|WR
|style="text-align:left;"|San Jose State
|2007–13, 15
|
|-
|style="text-align:left;"|
|TE
|style="text-align:left;"|Texas-El Paso
|1969
|6
|-
|style="text-align:left;"|
|T
|style="text-align:left;"|Washington
|1991
|2
|-
|style="text-align:left;"|
|DE
|style="text-align:left;"|Northeastern
|1994–96
|47
|-
|style="text-align:left;"|
|NT
|style="text-align:left;"|Alabama
|1978–84
|85
|-
|style="text-align:left;"|
|G
|style="text-align:left;"|Bucknell
|1938
|8
|-
|style="text-align:left;"|
|WR
|style="text-align:left;"|Long Beach City
|1994–95, 99
|20
|-
|style="text-align:left;"|
|DT
|style="text-align:left;"|Virginia
|1959–69
|139
|-
|style="text-align:left;"|
|LB
|style="text-align:left;"|Tuskegee
|1987
|3
|-
|style="text-align:left;"|
|T
|style="text-align:left;"|St. Mary's (Calif.)
|1934
|10
|-
|style="text-align:left;"|
|LB
|style="text-align:left;"|Carson-Newman
|2004
|4
|-
|style="text-align:left;"|
|LB
|style="text-align:left;"|Texas-El Paso
|1997
|11
|-
|style="text-align:left;"|
|CB/S
|style="text-align:left;"|Penn State
|2001–04
|51
|-
|style="text-align:left;"|
|NT
|style="text-align:left;"|Eastern Illinois
|1991–95
|69
|-
|}

K

{| class="wikitable sortable" style="text-align: center;" width = 68%;
|-
!width=15%|Player name
!width=7%|Position
!width=20%|College
!width=15%|Seasons
!width=6%|Games
|-
|style="text-align:left;"|
|B
|style="text-align:left;"|Nebraska
|1942–44
|19
|-
|style="text-align:left;"|
|T
|style="text-align:left;"|Nebraska
|1942
|7
|-
|style="text-align:left;"|
|DE
|style="text-align:left;"|Iowa
|2002–09
|
|-
|style="text-align:left;"|
|P
|style="text-align:left;"|Penn State
|2008–09
|87
|-
|style="text-align:left;"|
|T
|style="text-align:left;"|Catholic University
|1938
|8
|-
|style="text-align:left;"|
|C
|style="text-align:left;"|Hawaii
|1988
|16
|-
|style="text-align:left;"|
|E
|style="text-align:left;"|Iowa
|1952
|11
|-
|style="text-align:left;"|
|T
|style="text-align:left;"|Notre Dame
|1921
|23
|-
|style="text-align:left;"|
|T
|style="text-align:left;"|Missouri
|1948
|5
|-
|style="text-align:left;"|
|T
|style="text-align:left;"|Notre Dame
|1939–40
|20
|-
|style="text-align:left;"|
|E
|style="text-align:left;"|Texas Tech
|1949
|12
|-
|style="text-align:left;"|
|LB
|style="text-align:left;"|Washington
|1995
|13
|-
|style="text-align:left;"|
|WR
|style="text-align:left;"|California (Pa.)
|1988–91
|6
|-
|style="text-align:left;"|
|TE
|style="text-align:left;"|Wisconsin
|2017–18
|
|-
|style="text-align:left;"|
|DE
|style="text-align:left;"|Georgetown
|1944
|2
|-
|style="text-align:left;"|
|T
|style="text-align:left;"|Pittsburgh
|1929–30
|18
|-
|style="text-align:left;"|
|FB
|style="text-align:left;"|Michigan
|2016–17
|
|-
|style="text-align:left;"|
|B
|style="text-align:left;"|Georgia
|1945–47
|31
|-
|style="text-align:left;"|
|QB
|style="text-align:left;"|Notre Dame
|1988, 90–91
|8
|-
|style="text-align:left;"|
|G
|style="text-align:left;"|St. Thomas
|1935–36
|18
|-
|style="text-align:left;"|
|WR/KR
|style="text-align:left;"|Florida
|2004
|1
|-
|style="text-align:left;"|
|T
|style="text-align:left;"|Minnesota
|1939
|4
|-
|style="text-align:left;"|
|WR
|style="text-align:left;"|Oklahoma
|1979–80
|8
|-
|style="text-align:left;"|
|DT
|style="text-align:left;"|Houston
|1958
|12
|-
|style="text-align:left;"|
|B
|style="text-align:left;"|Mississippi
|1957–58
|24
|-
|style="text-align:left;"|
|CB
|style="text-align:left;"|Notre Dame
|1997
|12
|-
|style="text-align:left;"|
|DB
|style="text-align:left;"|Auburn
|1987
|3
|-
|style="text-align:left;"|
|DT
|style="text-align:left;"|Kentucky
|1956
|6
|-
|style="text-align:left;"|
|DB
|style="text-align:left;"|Southern Methodist
|1987
|1
|-
|style="text-align:left;"|
|CB
|style="text-align:left;"|Washington
|2017–21
|
|-
|style="text-align:left;"|
|B
|style="text-align:left;"|Southern California
|1949
|6
|-
|style="text-align:left;"|
|G
|style="text-align:left;"|Wake Forest
|1980–81, 83–84
|49
|-
|style="text-align:left;"|
|FB
|style="text-align:left;"|Ferrum
|1998
|2
|-
|style="text-align:left;"|
|QB
|style="text-align:left;"|Notre Dame
|2018
|3
|-
|style="text-align:left;"|
|C
|style="text-align:left;"|No College
|1921
|4
|-
|style="text-align:left;"|
|G/T
|style="text-align:left;"|Hawaii
|2005
|16
|-
|style="text-align:left;"|
|B
|style="text-align:left;"|No College
|1921
|1
|-
|style="text-align:left;"|
|E
|style="text-align:left;"|Colorado
|1954–62
|90
|-
|style="text-align:left;"|
|G
|style="text-align:left;"|Notre Dame
|1996
|9
|-
|style="text-align:left;"|
|DE
|style="text-align:left;"|Michigan
|1954, 56
|18
|-
|style="text-align:left;"|
|T
|style="text-align:left;"|Southern California
|1976–77
|25
|-
|style="text-align:left;"|
|DE
|style="text-align:left;"|Southern California
|1986
|6
|-
|style="text-align:left;"|
|T
|style="text-align:left;"|Arkansas
|1977–85
|133
|-
|style="text-align:left;"|
|T
|style="text-align:left;"|Colorado
|1976–77, 79–81
|53
|-
|style="text-align:left;"|
|T
|style="text-align:left;"|Ball State
|1987
|3
|-
|style="text-align:left;"|
|LB
|style="text-align:left;"|East Carolina
|1992–99
|112
|-
|style="text-align:left;"|
|RB
|style="text-align:left;"|Washington
|1972
|14
|-
|style="text-align:left;"|
|T
|style="text-align:left;"|Cincinnati
|1961–68
|110
|-
|style="text-align:left;"|
|B
|style="text-align:left;"|Lawrence
|1925–29
|46
|-
|style="text-align:left;"|
|E
|style="text-align:left;"|Notre Dame
|1947
|3
|-
|style="text-align:left;"|
|G
|style="text-align:left;"|Virginia
|1977
|4
|-
|style="text-align:left;"|
|G
|style="text-align:left;"|Idaho
|1958–68
|130
|-
|style="text-align:left;"|
|TE
|style="text-align:left;"|Michigan
|1957, 59–64
|89
|-
|style="text-align:left;"|
|B
|style="text-align:left;"|Milwaukee Teachers
|1949
|7
|-
|style="text-align:left;"|
|RB
|style="text-align:left;"|St. Norbert
|1970–71, 73–74
|51
|-
|style="text-align:left;"|
|TE
|style="text-align:left;"|Nebraska-Omaha
|2007
|9
|-
|style="text-align:left;"|
|S
|style="text-align:left;"|Northern Michigan
|1972–73
|5
|-
|style="text-align:left;"|
|DT
|style="text-align:left;"|Navy
|1995–98
|21
|-
|style="text-align:left;"|
|LB
|style="text-align:left;"|Indiana
|1970
|6
|-
|style="text-align:left;"|
|FB
|style="text-align:left;"|Shippensburg
|2007–15
|16
|-
|style="text-align:left;"|
|WR
|style="text-align:left;"|Wisconsin–Whitewater
|2018–19
|
|-
|style="text-align:left;"|
|T
|style="text-align:left;"|Notre Dame
|1933–34
|20
|-
|style="text-align:left;"|
|G
|style="text-align:left;"|Minnesota
|1941–46
|54
|-
|}

See also
List of Green Bay Packers players: A–D
List of Green Bay Packers players: L–R
List of Green Bay Packers players: S–Z

References
General

Specific

E
players